ANT1 may refer to:
ANT1 – Greek TV network airing in Greece and Cyprus
ANT1 Group – Owner of ANT1 network
ANT1 Pacific – Subscription TV channel partially owned by ANT1 Greece
ANT1 Europe – Free TV channel partially owned by ANT1 Greece
ANT1 Satellite – Subscription TV channel partially owned by ANT1 Greece
ANT1 (protein) – ANT1 (adenine nucleotide translocator 1) is the most abundant protein in the inner mitochondrial membrane. It is an enzyme that in humans is encoded by the SLC25A4 gene

See also